Solatopupa psarolena is a species of air-breathing land snail, a terrestrial pulmonate gastropod mollusk in the family Chondrinidae. This species is found in France and Italy.

References

Chondrinidae
Gastropods described in 1859
Taxonomy articles created by Polbot